Tae-woong is a Korean masculine given name. Its meaning differs based on the hanja used to write each syllable of the name. There are 20 hanja with the reading "tae" and two hanja with the reading "woong" on the South Korean government's official list of hanja which may be used in given names.

People with this name include:
Baik Tae-ung (born 1962), South Korean law professor and former prisoner of conscience
Uhm Tae-woong (born 1974), South Korean actor
Choi Tae-woong (born 1976), South Korean volleyball player
Park Tae-woong (born 1988), South Korean footballer

See also
List of Korean given names

References

Korean masculine given names